Syed Mohammad Sharfuddin Quadri (25 December 1901 – 30 December 2015) was an Indian independence activist, Gandhian and a physician of the Unani system of medicine. He accompanied Gandhiji in the Salt March of 1930 and was a prison mate of the Indian leader when they were incarcerated by the British regime at Cuttack jail. He was the founder of a medical magazine, Hikmat-e-Bangala and was among the group of people who founded the Calcutta Unani Medical College and Hospital. The Government of India awarded him the third highest civilian honour of the Padma Bhushan, in 2007, for his contributions to Indian medicine.

Biography 
Syed Mohammad Sharfuddin Quadri was born on 25 December 1901 to Mohammad Mohibbudin, a Unani practitioner, at Kumrava of Nawada district, in the Indian state of Bihar. His family moved to Calcutta when he was in the mid-thirties where he spent the rest of his life. Learning Unani medicine from his father, he assisted his father in his practice. During this time, he was also involved in the Indian freedom struggle and participated in the Salt March in 1930, along with Gandhiji and was jailed. He continued his association with the freedom activists and when Rajendra Prasad, who would later become the first president of India, fell ill due to respiratory problems, Quadri assisted his father in treating the future president.

Syed Mohammad Sharfuddin Quadri opposed the two-nation theory that advocated for the division of colonial India.

Quadri was the founder of  Hikmat-e-Bangala a medical magazine focused on Unani system of medicine, but the magazine eventually was closed doen due to paucity of funds. In 1994, he assisted Syed Faizan Ahmad in founding the Calcutta Unani Medical College and Hospital. The Government of India awarded him the civilian honor of the Padma Bhushan in 2007. He died on 30 December 2015, at the age of 114, at his Ripon Street residence in Kolkata, survived by his seven children.

See also 
 Salt March

References

External links 
 

Recipients of the Padma Bhushan in medicine
1901 births
2015 deaths
People from Nawada district
20th-century Indian medical doctors
Unani practitioners
Indian independence activists from Bihar
Gandhians
Men supercentenarians
Medical doctors from Bihar